Jose C. Principe is an American Bioengineer, focusing in adaptive signal processing, kernel learning, information theoretic learning, neural networks, brain machine interfaces and cognitive architectures, currently Distinguished Professor of Electrical and Biomedical Engineering and BellSouth Professor at University of Florida.

References

Year of birth missing (living people)
Living people
University of Florida faculty
21st-century American engineers
University of Florida alumni